"Dance with the Wolves" is a song from Ukrainian singer Ruslana’s fifth studio album Wild Dances, and was released on 11 January 2005.

Two music videos were made for the song. During the shootings, Ruslana had to be in a cage with wild wolves. One of the videoclips includes frames shot during the Orange Revolution in which Ruslana took an active participation. The music video for this song is available through the Ruslana fan website.

More information
"Dance with the Wolves" is the first single of the singer to come out in Europe after her Gold single "Wild Dances".

Produced by Ruslana, Olexander Ksenofontov.
Directors: Evhen Mytrofanov, Oles' Sanin

While shooting the video, Ruslana and the wolves were not separated by a cage, but a trainer was standing nearby.

Official remixes and other versions

Charts

Ring Edition

Release history

References

External links
.
Amazon.com about Dance with the Wolves.

Ruslana songs
2005 singles
2004 songs
Songs written by Ruslana
EMI Records singles
Liberty Records singles